The 2011 International Country Cuneo was a professional tennis tournament played on outdoor clay courts. It was part of the 2011 ITF Women's Circuit. It took place in Cuneo, Italy between June 27 and July 3, 2011.

WTA entrants

Seeds

Rankings are as of June 20, 2011.

Other entrants
The following players received wildcards into the singles main draw:
  Camilla Rosatello
  Elena Bovina
  Camila Giorgi
  Karin Knapp

The following players received entry from the qualifying draw:
  Maria Abramović
  Lara Arruabarrena-Vecino
  Eva Fernández-Brugués
  Giulia Gatto-Monticone

Champions

Singles

 Anna Tatishvili def.  Arantxa Rus, 6–4, 6–3

Doubles

 Mandy Minella /  Stefanie Vögele def.  Eva Birnerová /  Vesna Dolonts, 6–3, 6–2

References
Official Website
ITF Search 

2011 ITF Women's Circuit
Clay court tennis tournaments
Tennis tournaments in Italy
2011 in Italian tennis